The 2015–16 Namibia Premier League is the 27th season of top-tier football in Namibia. The season started on 11 September 2014. Tigers won their first championship since the league's first season in 1985, clinching the title with a week to go and finishing nine points ahead of runners up Black Africa.

United Stars, Julinho Sporting and Flamingo finished in the bottom three spots and will be relegated to the First Division for the 2016-2017 season.

Teams
A total of 16 teams contested the league. Touch & Go F.C., Rebels F.C. and Benfica F.C. were each relegated to First Division after finishing 14th, 15th and 16th, respectively. Flamingos FC, Rundu Chiefs and Young Chiefs F.C. are all new additions to the competition this year.

Stadiums and locations

League table

Results
All teams play in a double round robin system (home and away).

Results by round

Positions by round

References

Namibia
Seasons in Namibian football leagues